KRZX (106.1 FM) is a radio station licensed to serve the community of Redlands, Colorado. The station is owned by Ted and Jana Tucker, through licensee Cochise Media Licenses LLC, and airs a classic rock format.

The station was assigned the KRZX call letters by the Federal Communications Commission on May 1, 2006.

References

External links
Official Website

RZX
Radio stations established in 2010
2010 establishments in Colorado
Classic rock radio stations in the United States
Mesa County, Colorado